Francisco Ramírez Martínez (born 19 April 1943) is a Mexican politician affiliated with the Institutional Revolutionary Party. He served as Municipal President of Aguascalientes from 1978 to 1980.

See also
 List of mayors of Aguascalientes

References

1943 births
Living people
People from Aguascalientes City
Institutional Revolutionary Party politicians
20th-century Mexican politicians
Politicians from Aguascalientes
Municipal presidents of Aguascalientes